Lego Games is a product range of the construction toy Lego. The theme was first introduced in 2009.

Overview
The theme focuses on a series of playable games of different types, all of which use Lego bricks, and use the Lego concept of building to encourage players to change and adapt the rules of the games.

Construction sets
The Lego Games sets are board games created by designer Cephas Howard, with consultants Bernie DeKoven and Reiner Knizia, that incorporate Lego pieces as components for the game. Most use original themes and settings, though a small number have been based on existing Lego themes, such as Harry Potter Hogwarts which is based on the Lego Harry Potter theme, and Ninjago: The Board Game, based on Ninjago. The Ramses characters represent a mini-theme within the Games line, comprising three of the sets so far: Ramses Pyramid, Orient Bazaar, and Ramses Return. A more promoted subtheme is the Role-playing game based Heroica, with boards that can be connected to one another. All of the sets make use of the distinctive Lego Dice - a solid plastic, Lego-compatible iomji with soft rubber rimming on each edge to give the die a particularly strong bounce. Depending on the game, the die can be built with different Lego tiles on its faces which will affect gameplay in different ways. The age recommendations range from five and up to eight and up.

The first Lego Games sets were released on July 2, 2009, in the United Kingdom. These ten sets varied in size from around 100 to 350 pieces. Four of the sets - Lava Dragon, Pirate Code, Minotarus, and Creationary - were later released in the United States in March 2010. In March 2010 four new sets were released in the United Kingdom, ranging in size from around 90 pieces to 120. In the United States five of the original ten games were released in June 2010, with only Lunar Command not getting released. This delay between European and American releases has repeated with each subsequent wave of new games. As part of a promotion for the American release, a tour of 13 different parts of the United States was undertaken from July 2 to September 19, 2010.

In July 2010 another four new sets were released in the United Kingdom. At around the same time, Shave a Sheep and Harry Potter Hogwarts were released in the United States, with the former game being renamed "Wild Wool," with Magma Monster and Orient Bazaar following in August and Atlantis Treasure in October. Christmas 2010 saw the distribution of the special set 2010: Happy Holidays - The Christmas Game, a gift to LEGO staff and partners. A further five sets were scheduled for general UK release in early 2011.

Awards and nominations
In 2009, Minotaurus and Ramses Pyramid were awarded "DreamToys" in the Games category  by the Toy Retailers Association.

In 2010, Hogwarts Game was awarded "DreamToys" in the Games category by the Toy Retailers Association.

See also
 BrikWars

References

External links
 Lego Games  at Lego.com

2000s toys
2010s toys
Reiner Knizia games
Products introduced in 2009
Products and services discontinued in 2013